The winners of the 2016 IndieWire Critics Poll were announced on December 19, 2016.

Winners and nominees

Multiple nominations and wins

Multiple nominations

Multiple wins

References

Indiewire Critics' Poll
Indiewire Critics' Poll